Yanqing Prison is a prison in Yanqing District in Beijing municipality, China.

See also
List of prisons in Beijing municipality

References
Laogai Research Foundation Handbook

Prisons in Beijing
Yanqing District